Brian Douglas Williams (born May 5, 1959) is an American journalist and television news anchor. He was a correspondent for NBC Nightly News starting in 1993, before his promotion to anchor and managing editor of the broadcast in 2004.  

In February 2015, Williams was suspended by NBC News for six months for "misrepresent[ing] events which occurred while he was covering the Iraq War in 2003". Four months after the incident came to light, the network removed him from NBC Nightly News permanently and reassigned him as the breaking news anchor for MSNBC. In September 2016, he became the host of MSNBC's political news show, The 11th Hour. Williams announced in November 2021 that he would be leaving MSNBC and NBC News at the completion of his contract the following month, when he hosted his final episode of The 11th Hour.

Early life
Born on May 5, 1959, in Ridgewood, New Jersey, Williams was raised in a "boisterous" Catholic home of largely Irish descent. He is the son of Dorothy May (née Pampel) and Gordon Lewis Williams, who was an executive vice president of the National Retail Merchants Association, in New York. His mother was an amateur stage actress. Williams is the youngest of four siblings.

He lived in Elmira, New York, for nine years before moving to Middletown Township, New Jersey, when he was in junior high school.

Williams graduated from Mater Dei High School, a Roman Catholic high school in the New Monmouth section of Middletown. While in high school, he was a volunteer firefighter for three years at the Middletown Township Fire Department. Also while in high school, he was the editorial editor for the school newspaper. He suffered an accident during a football game that left him with a crooked nose. His first job was as a busboy at Perkins Restaurant & Bakery.

Following high school, Williams attended Brookdale Community College before transferring to the Catholic University of America and then George Washington University. He did not earn a degree, ultimately interning in the White House Press office during the administration of President Jimmy Carter. He later called leaving college one of his "great regrets".

Career

Early broadcast career
Williams first worked in broadcasting in 1981 at KOAM-TV in Pittsburg, Kansas. The following year he covered news in the Washington, D.C., area at then-independent station WTTG, then worked in Philadelphia for WCAU, then owned and operated by CBS. Beginning in 1987 he broadcast in New York City at WCBS.

Williams joined NBC News in 1993, where he anchored the national Weekend Nightly News and was chief White House correspondent. In the summer of 1996 he began serving as anchor and managing editor of The News with Brian Williams, broadcast on MSNBC and CNBC. Williams also served as primary substitute anchor on The NBC Nightly News with Tom Brokaw, and its weekend anchor. He reported the accident and death of Diana, Princess of Wales.

Rise and ouster at NBC Nightly News
Williams became anchor of NBC Nightly News on December 2, 2004, replacing the retiring Tom Brokaw. In December 2004, when Williams took the helm, he had to apologize for saying there are "bigger problems" than newsroom diversity. NBC News President Neal Shapiro vowed to redouble the company's minority hiring efforts.

He still was allowed to continue and his coverage of Hurricane Katrina was widely praised, particularly "for venting his anger and frustration over the government's failure to act quickly to help the victims." The network was awarded a Peabody, the committee concluding that "Williams, and the entire staff of NBC Nightly News exemplified the highest levels of journalistic excellence." Williams accepted the award on behalf of the organization.  NBC Nightly News also earned the George Polk Award and the duPont-Columbia University Award for its Katrina coverage. Vanity Fair called Williams' work on Katrina "Murrow-worthy" and reported that during the hurricane, he became "a nation's anchor". The New York Times characterized Williams' reporting of the hurricane as "a defining moment".

In 2007, Time magazine named Williams one of the 100 most influential people in the world.

In 2009, Williams was awarded the Walter Cronkite Award for Excellence in Journalism by Arizona State University. At the announcement of the award, Cronkite said he was one of Williams' "ardent admirers" and described him as a "fastidious newsman" who brought credit to the television news reporting profession.

While anchoring the Nightly News, Williams received 12 News & Documentary Emmy Awards. For "outstanding" work as anchor and managing editor of the Nightly News, he received one Emmy in 2006 (for Nightly News coverage of the 2005 Hurricane Katrina), two in 2007, one in 2009, two in 2010, one in 2011, one in 2013, and one in 2014. The 2014 Emmy was awarded Nightly News for its coverage of a deadly series of tornadoes in Oklahoma, for which it also received the duPont-Columbia University Award.

Williams also received a 2012 Emmy for his interview program Rock Center and a 2013 Emmy for being one of the executive producers and editors of a documentary on the John F. Kennedy Presidential Library and Museum. He also shared a 2014 Emmy awarded for an NBC News Special on the Boston Marathon bombing.

Based on the Nielsen ratings, from late 2008 Williams' news broadcast consistently had more viewers than its two main rivals, ABC's World News Tonight and CBS Evening News. In fact, from late 2008 to late 2014, NBC Nightly News beat the other two network programs in the Nielsen ratings all but one week.

In February 2015, Williams was suspended for six months from the broadcast for misrepresenting his experience in the 2003 invasion of Iraq. At the time, his salary was $10 million a year, with a five-year contract signed in December 2014.

Rock Center with Brian Williams

On October 4, 2011, it was announced that Williams would be the host of Rock Center with Brian Williams, a news magazine program premiering on October 31, 2011, at 10:00 pm Eastern, replacing the canceled drama series The Playboy Club.

Named after the nickname of Rockefeller Center, the New York City landmark where NBC Radio City Studios are located, the program would become the first new NBC News program to launch in primetime in nearly two decades.

NBC cancelled Rock Center on May 10, 2013, due to low ratings; the network was also having trouble finding a permanent time slot for the program. The last show aired on June 21, 2013.

Williams reportedly felt "insulted" by the program's cancellation.

Iraq War helicopter fabrication

On February 4, 2015, Williams apologized for and recanted his disproven Iraq War story, which he had told on a Nightly News broadcast on January 30, 2015. He claimed that a military helicopter he was traveling in had been "forced down after being hit by an RPG". Soon after it aired, Williams' story was criticized by Lance Reynolds, a flight engineer on board one of the three Chinook helicopters that had been attacked. Reynolds and other crew members said Williams had been aboard one of a separate group of helicopters from the helicopter that had been fired upon, which was flying about half an hour behind and was forced to make an emergency landing because of a sandstorm rather than an attack. Additional soldiers soon came forward to confirm that Williams was not in the group of helicopters that had come under fire and that Williams had inserted himself into the event.

In his original on-air reporting of the incident on March 26, 2003, for Dateline NBC, Williams had said only that "the Chinook ahead of us was almost blown out of the sky ... by an RPG" and made an emergency landing. Introducing the piece, NBC News anchor Tom Brokaw described Williams as having "got [him]self into ... a close call in the skies over Iraq", and the story was headlined, "Target Iraq: Helicopter NBC's Brian Williams Was Riding In Comes Under Fire".

A book published by NBC in 2003 said that "Army Chinook helicopters [were] forced to make a desert landing after being attacked by Iraqi Fedayeen", with Williams aboard.

In a 2007 retelling, Williams did not state that his craft had been hit, but said, "I looked down the tube of an RPG that had been fired at us, and it hit the chopper in front of us." This contradicted the statements by the crew of the craft that was hit, that it was at least 30 minutes ahead of Williams' helicopter. However, the soldiers who piloted Williams' helicopter in Iraq said no rocket-propelled grenades had been fired at the aircraft, a fact that Williams did not dispute and apologized for. In a 2013 account, Williams said his helicopter had been "hit ... and landed very quickly".

In a February 5, 2015, interview with CNN, the pilot of the Chinook in which Williams was traveling said that while the aircraft did not sustain RPG fire, it did indeed sustain small-arms fire and the door gunners returned fire.

On February 10, 2015, NBC News President Deborah Turness suspended Williams without pay for six months from his position as Managing Editor and Anchor of the Nightly News for having misrepresented the Iraq incident. On June 18, 2015, he was demoted to breaking news anchor for MSNBC.

Journalist Malcolm Gladwell reexamined the story in a podcast episode entitled "Free Brian Williams" from his Revisionist History podcast. Gladwell argued that the evolving versions of Williams' story over many years matched the normal pattern of how human memory works. Over time, people conflate and combine different memories, shift times and locations, and misremember details large and small.

Return to MSNBC
In September 2015, Williams returned to the air as MSNBC's chief anchor. News events that Williams has since covered for MSNBC include Pope Francis's trip to the United States; the Umpqua Community College shooting; and terrorist attacks in Paris, San Bernardino, Brussels, and Nice. In January 2016, Williams also added the role of chief elections anchor for MSNBC and subsequently debuted in the new role during coverage of the 2016 Iowa caucuses.

As part of his chief anchor duties, Williams anchored The 11th Hour with Brian Williams a nightly news and politics wrap-up show. The New York Post labeled the program a "legit hit" in February 2019, noting the show had been "beating [competitors] CNN and Fox News for three months straight." Williams, alongside co-anchors Rachel Maddow & Joy Reid and lead analyst Nicolle Wallace, led the network's coverage of the 2020 United States presidential election.

Williams announced on the November 9, 2021, episode of The 11th Hour with Brian Williams that he would be leaving NBC News and MSNBC at the expiration of his contract the following month, after five years hosting the show and 28 years with the networks. His final night hosting the show was December 9, 2021.

Other activities
Williams frequently appeared on The Daily Show as a celebrity guest interviewed by Jon Stewart and in 2007, made regular cameos as a giant head sidekick looking on Jon Stewart and helping out with pronunciations of foreign names and occasionally other foreign affairs all beginning at the premiere of the new Daily Show set. He appeared on the Weekend Update segment of the season 32 premiere of Saturday Night Live, hosted by Dane Cook. He then hosted a season 33 episode on November 3, 2007, becoming the first, and still only, sitting network news anchor to host the show.

Williams appeared on Sesame Street in a 2007 episode, announcing the word of the day, "squid", in a special broadcast. Williams appeared on Sesame Street again in a 2008 episode, reporting for Sesame Street Nightly News about the "mine-itis" outbreak, becoming a victim. He was also the host of the 2009 Annual Sesame Workshop Benefit Gala.

On February 22, 2010, while covering the Winter Olympics, Williams did a skit with Brian Williams, the Canadian sportscaster of CTV Sports, on the CTV Olympic set. Some in the media dubbed this the new "Battle of the Brians", as NBC's Williams compared his own modest set to CTV's expensive Olympic studio.

Williams regularly appeared on Late Night with Jimmy Fallon, where he slow jams the news of the previous week as Fallon sings and reiterates what Williams says, with The Roots providing the musical backing. A mash-up video created by Fallon, where Williams appears to rap to hip-hop instrumentals, became popular within a few hours. Williams has also made numerous appearances on Late Show with David Letterman. During an appearance on July 26, 2011, he demonstrated a skilled vocal impersonation of TV personality Regis Philbin. He has also appeared on Late Night with Conan O'Brien, where he took part in numerous skits and interviews.

Williams made frequent guest appearances on NBC's television comedy 30 Rock, as a caricatured version of himself. In the episode "The Ones", he is seen at home receiving proposition calls meant for Tracy Jordan. In "Audition Day", he auditions to be a new TGS cast member. He also is seen once on the show taunting Tina Fey's character, Liz Lemon. In April 2012, on the West Coast installment of the 30 Rock season6 live show, Williams portrayed a news anchor covering the Apollo 13 story.

Williams was the commencement speaker at Bates College in May 2005, The Catholic University of America in May 2004, Ohio State University in June 2008, and at the University of Notre Dame in 2010. In May 2012, he spoke at the George Washington University commencement on the National Mall. He was the commencement speaker for Elon University's graduating class of 2013, which included his son Douglas.

Williams also collaborated on the Encyclopedia of World History from Backpack Books published in 2003.

Williams has written for publications including The New York Times and Time magazine.

Controversies

Williams' statements about Hurricane Katrina and its aftermath were received with scrutiny. For example, Williams referred inconsistently to a suicide inside the New Orleans Superdome after Katrina. CNN reported in a 2005 television documentary that Williams said he was not a witness to the suicide: "We heard the story of a man killing himself, falling from the upper deck."

Appearing on The Daily Show in August 2006, he told host Jon Stewart that he was nearly hit the previous month by Katyusha rockets fired from Lebanon by Hezbollah while flying in an Israeli Air Force (IAF) Black Hawk helicopter: "Here's a view of rockets I have never seen, passing underneath us, 1,500 feet beneath us. And we've got the gunner doors on this thing, and I'm saying to the general, some four-star: 'It wouldn't take much for them to adjust the aim and try to do a ring toss right through our open doors, would it?' Anytime you want to cross over to the other side, baby, travel with me."

In another version of the same story, Williams claimed that the rockets passed "just underneath the helicopter I was riding in." The claim was drawn into question since there are no four-star generals in the Israel Defense Forces (IDF), Israeli helicopter doors are routinely closed during flights and the IAF's Black Hawks do not carry gunners. An IDF spokesman who was on the helicopter in question did confirm afterwards that there was Katyusha fire and, although the helicopter was not in danger, the "trajectory of the rockets was beneath us."

A reference to the fall of the Berlin Wall also received scrutiny. In 2008, Williams said he was "at the Brandenburg Gate the night the wall came down", while CBS and other sources report that he did not arrive until the next day.

Another statement by Williams, this one regarding the Navy SEALs, also received attention. Williams said he flew into Baghdad with SEAL Team Six, but Special Operations Command spokesman Ken McGraw stated the SEALs do not embed journalists.

On April 7, 2017, Williams referred to the 2017 Shayrat missile strike footage of missiles being fired from a US warship as "beautiful pictures" after quoting Leonard Cohen's "First We Take Manhattan". This brought widespread criticism from news organizations and social media.

Personal life

Williams married Jane Gillan Stoddard, at the First Presbyterian Church of New Canaan, Connecticut, on June 7, 1986. They have two children: Allison, an actress, and Doug, the late-night anchor of Geico SportsNite on SportsNet New York. Williams and his wife live in New Canaan, and own a beach house in Bay Head, New Jersey and a pied-à-terre in Midtown Manhattan.

From 2006 to 2015, Williams was a member of the board of directors of the Medal of Honor Foundation; he resigned days after his suspension from NBC.

Honorary degrees

Television

Career timeline
 1981: KOAM-TV
 1982–1986: WTTG-TV correspondent
 1985: Panorama host
 1985–1987: WCAU-TV New Jersey correspondent
 1987–1993: WCBS-TV anchor of weekday noon and weekend night newscasts; reporter
 1993–2021: NBC News
 1993–1994, 1996–2004: correspondent
 1993–1999: NBC Nightly News weekend anchor
 1994–1996: White House correspondent
 1996–2004: MSNBC The News with Brian Williams anchor
 2004–2015: NBC Nightly News anchor
 2011–2013: Rock Center with Brian Williams host
 2015: six-month suspension from NBC Nightly News
 2015–2021: MSNBC chief breaking news anchor
 2016–2021: The 11th Hour with Brian Williams anchor

See also
 List of journalists in New York City

References

External links

 NBC News bio
 
 "Brian Williams: My First Big Break", Mediabistro (2012)
 "The duPont Talks: Tom Brokaw and Brian Williams", Columbia Journalism School (2014)
 Chmiel, David, "His Heart Belongs to Jersey", New Jersey Monthly, June 9, 2008.

|-

1959 births
20th-century American journalists
21st-century American journalists
American firefighters
American male journalists
American people of Irish descent
American television reporters and correspondents
American war correspondents
Brookdale Community College alumni
George Washington University alumni
Journalists from New Jersey
Journalists from New York City
Living people
Mater Dei High School (New Jersey) alumni
Mass media-related controversies in the United States
MSNBC people
NBC News people
Peabody Award winners
People from Elmira, New York
People from Middletown Township, New Jersey
People from New Canaan, Connecticut
People from Ridgewood, New Jersey
Television anchors from Philadelphia
News & Documentary Emmy Award winners
Managing editors